Cecil King (22 February 1921 – 7 April 1986) was famous for his painting 
Born Rathdrum, County Wicklow, Ireland, King was largely self-taught as an artist. He had his first one-man show in 1959, but worked as a businessman and did not become a full-time artist until 1964. While he began painting in an expressionist style, his mature works have a distinctive cool minimalist formality and often involves clean blocks of even colour cleaved at an acute angle. The break came in the late 1960s. He lived for many years in Blackrock on Idrone Terrace.

A retrospective of his work was held at the Hugh Lane Municipal Gallery in 1981, another was held in the Irish Museum of Modern Art on 27 February 2008.

Work in collections
 Dublin City University:
 Thrust
 The Arts Council of Northern Ireland:
 Berlin Painting
 The Arts Council of Ireland:
 Berlin Painting 21 (1970)
 Traverse, '84 (1984)
 The National University of Ireland, Galway:
 Untitled tapestry (1974)
 Trinity College, Dublin:
 Berlin Painting (1970)
 Berlin Painting (1971)
 The Tate, London
 The Hugh Lane Municipal Gallery, Dublin
 The Government Art Collection, UK

References and external links
 Cecil King at Irish Museum of Modern Art
 David Scott (1989), The modern art collection, Trinity College Dublin. Dublin: Trinity College Dublin Press. 

1921 births
1986 deaths
20th-century Irish painters
Irish male painters
People from County Wicklow
20th-century Irish male artists